Robin Wasserman (born May 31, 1978) is an American novelist and essayist.

Wasserman grew up outside of Philadelphia and graduated from Harvard University and UCLA. Before she was an author she was an associate editor at a children's book publisher. Wasserman has published multiple books for children and young adults, and two critically acclaimed novels for adults. Her nonfiction has been published by VQR, Buzz Feed, Lit Hub, Los Angeles Review of Books, and The Atlantic. She currently lives in Los Angeles, California, and is on the faculty of the Mountainview Low-Residency MFA program at SNHU. She also writes for television.

Works

Seven Deadly Sins series

The Seven Deadly Sins series from Simon & Schuster features seven morally bankrupt teenagers in a small California town. Each novel revolves around one of the sins and each character's transgressions specific to that sin. They follow the lives of Harper Grace, Beth Manning, Adam Morgan, Kane Geary, Miranda Stevens, Reed Sawyer, Katherine (Kaia) Sellers, and their French teacher, Jack Powell. Novels in the series are Lust, Envy, Pride, Wrath, Sloth, Gluttony, and Greed.

The series was made into a four-hour miniseries, which debuted on the Lifetime Movie Network on May 23 and 24, 2010.

Chasing Yesterday series

Awakening
Betrayal
Truth

Skinned trilogy
Skinned (2008)
Crashed (September 2009)
Wired (September 2010)

Since publication, this series title, book names, and cover images have been changed. They are the same books between the covers, however.
Cold Awakening trilogy:
Frozen
Shattered
Torn

Other books
 How I Survived My Most Embarrassing Moments (2004)
 Hacking Harvard (2007)
 Candy Apple
 Callie for President (2008)
 Life, Starring Me! (2009)
 Wish You Were Here, Liza (2010)
 The Book of Blood and Shadow (2013)
 The Waking Dark (2014)
 Girls on Fire (2016)
Mother Daughter Widow Wife (2020)

References

External links

 
 

1978 births
American children's writers
American horror writers
Harvard University alumni
University of California, Los Angeles alumni
Writers of young adult science fiction
American women novelists
21st-century American novelists
21st-century American women writers
Living people